Cataleptoneta is a genus of  leptonetids that was first described by J. Denis in 1955.

Species
 it contains seven species:
Cataleptoneta aesculapii (Brignoli, 1968) – Turkey
Cataleptoneta detriticola Deltshev & Li, 2013 – Bulgaria, Greece
Cataleptoneta edentula Denis, 1955 (type) – Lebanon, Israel
Cataleptoneta lingulata Wang & Li, 2010 – Croatia
Cataleptoneta sbordonii (Brignoli, 1968) – Turkey
Cataleptoneta semipinnata Wang & Li, 2010 – Greece
Cataleptoneta sengleti (Brignoli, 1974) – Greece (Crete)

See also
 List of Leptonetidae species

References

Araneomorphae genera
Leptonetidae
Spiders of Asia